"Cold Beer Calling My Name" is a song recorded by American country music singers Jameson Rodgers and Luke Combs. It was released on December 7, 2020 as the second single from Rodgers' debut studio album Bet You're from a Small Town. The song was co-written by Rodgers, along with Alysa Vanderheym, Brett Tyler, and Hunter Phelps, and produced by Chris Farren and Jake Mitchell.

Background
Rodgers served as an opening act for Combs during the latter's 2019 "Beer Never Broke My Heart Tour", and learned a thing about instant country classics from Combs's stage.

Rodgers said in a statement: “It’s a fun, easy song, and I thought it’d be cool to have someone on it and at the time I was out with Combs, I asked Luke if he’d like to sing on it – I know he’s a cold beer drinker like myself – and luckily it worked out and I’m excited for everybody to hear it.”

Content
Joseph Hudak of Rolling Stone pointed out the song starting with some jagged guitars, like Jason Aldean's style, and Rodgers singing about driving fast into an endless night.

Music video
The music video was released on February 10, 2021, directed by Dustin Haney. Rodgers and Combs play beer delivery drivers. When they get off of work, singer-songwriter Drew Parker calls them to invite them to a bonfire, and tells them to bring a six-pack of beer.

Charts

Weekly charts

Year-end charts

References

2020 singles
2020 songs
Jameson Rodgers songs
Luke Combs songs
Male vocal duets
Songs written by Jameson Rodgers
Columbia Nashville Records singles